Ingram Independent School District is a public school district based in Ingram, Texas, United States. The first school building opened in 1936. Ingram ISD has grown into a three campus district providing education for the citizens of Ingram (and the surrounding communities), population of approximately 1,870.

Ingram's Secondary campus accommodates Ingram residents as well as middle and high school-aged residents from Divide Independent School District, and Hunt Independent School District.

Ingram ISD, with an open transfer policy, accepts requests from students all over the Texas hill-country without an attendance fee. The transfer rate, from neighboring school districts, has steadily grown since the 2012-2013 school year, from 9% to 15% due to the numerous changes implemented with the support of the district administrators, school board members, and campus staff. The secondary campus added a layer of complexity to their robust curriculum schedule (offerings of AP, Dual Credit, and OnRamps courses) by implementing the AVID program, as part of the early college transition over the next few years. The select middle school and high school campus staff attended a rigorous training in the summer of 2019 to ensure AVID was implemented with fidelity. AVID stands for Advancement Via Individual Determination, meant to provide students with the strategies and skills for college and career readiness.

History
In Fall of 2019, it was announced that Ingram ISD achieved a well-deserved "A" report card ranking with an overall accountability grade of a 90 (as reported by the Texas Education Agency).

School Board
Mission Statement: The purpose of Ingram ISD is to ensure an environment that provides for rigorous learning and support; where each student masters the curriculum at every level, is continually inspired to ascend to the highest levels of good character, and thoughtfully and diligently prepares for a successful life after high school.
The Ingram ISD Board of Trustees consists of seven members elected by the public to serve overlapping three-year terms. Elections are held annually in May. Candidates do not represent specific geographical areas. Each represents Ingram ISD as a whole. Following the annual election, the Board elects officers (president, vice president and secretary) to serve one-year terms.
President- Jack Fairchild (term expires May 2021)
Vice President- Vern Stehling (term expires May 2021)
Secretary- Carlos Chapa III (term expires May 2020)
Member- Rachel London (term expires May 2020)
Member- Allen Samford (term expires May 2020)
Member- Adam Nichols (term expires May 2022)
Member- Wayne McClintock (term expires May 2022)

Superintendents